SK Aritma Prague is a Czech football club located in Prague-Vokovice. It currently plays in the Czech Fourth Division.

References

External links
  
 SK Aritma Prague at the website of the Prague Football Association 
 Profile at soccerway.com

Football clubs in the Czech Republic
Sport in Prague
Association football clubs established in 1908
1908 establishments in Austria-Hungary